From Under the Bleachers is the debut album from singer/songwriter Zameer.

Track listing

Singles

Music videos
Zameer has released 4 music videos for From Under The Bleachers:

References

External links
 Zameer Rizvi

2010 debut albums
Zameer Rizvi albums